The Convent Church of San Francisco is an historic church in the city of Puebla, in the Mexican state of Puebla.

See also
List of buildings in Puebla City
 Statue of Sebastian de Aparicio

External links

 

Roman Catholic churches in Puebla (city)